Leonardoxa is a genus of flowering plants in the family Fabaceae. It belongs to the subfamily Detarioideae.

Species
Leonardoxa africana (Baill.) Aubrév.
Leonardoxa romii (De Wild.) Aubrév.

Detarioideae
Fabaceae genera
Taxa named by André Aubréville